The Beijing Guozijian, located on Guozijian Street in Beijing, China, was China's national university during the Yuan, Ming and Qing dynasties, and the last Guozijian of China. Most of the Beijing Guozijian's buildings were built during the Ming Dynasty and it remains an important heritage site in China. During the Hundred Days' Reform of the Qing Dynasty, the education and administration of education functions of Guozijian was mainly replaced by the Imperial University of Peking (Jingshi Daxuetang), later known as Peking University. The Guozijian was shut down in 1905.

The Guozijian, often translated into English as the Imperial Academy or Imperial College, was the national central institute of learning in ancient Chinese dynasties. It was the highest institute of learning in China's traditional educational system. Emperors in imperial China would also frequently visit the Guozijian to read Confucian classics to thousands of students.

History

The Guozijian was first built in 1306 during the 24th year of Zhiyuan Reign of the Yuan Dynasty, and was reconstructed and renovated on a large scale during Yongle and Zhengtong reigns of the Ming Dynasty.

The administrative officials of Guozijian were called Chief (Jìjiǔ), Dean of Studies (Sīyè), or Proctor (Jiānchéng).  The students who studied at the Guozijian were called "Jiansheng" (Jiànshēng), and they mainly studied the Confucian classics.

Location and layout
The Guozijian is situated at the central area of the Guozijian Street and adjoining several other well known imperial structures of Beijing, and the complex of Guozijian accords with the Chinese tradition which dictates that the temple should be on the "left" and the school or college on the "right".  To the east of the Guozijian, lies the Confucius Temple, the second largest Confucius temple in all of China, and the Yonghegong Temple, the largest Lama Temple in Beijing.

The whole complex of Guozijian faces south, and it has a total building area of more than 10,000 square meters or 107,639 square feet. Along the central axis of Guozijian are the Jixian Gate (the front gate), Taixue Gate (the second gate), the Glazed Archway, Biyong, Yiluntang, and Jingyiting (Jingyi Pavilion). On its east and west sides are the six halls and palaces in the traditional symmetrical layout.

See also
Guozijian
Kongmiao, Beijing
Peking University
History of Beijing
Sungkyunkwan, Seoul

References

External links
 

1306 establishments in Asia
14th-century establishments in China
Buildings and structures in Beijing
Dongcheng District, Beijing
Education in Beijing
History of Beijing
Major National Historical and Cultural Sites in Beijing
Tourist attractions in Beijing